Stephen Scahill (born 19 November 1973) is an Australian former professional rugby league player who played in the 1990s. He played his entire club football career with the Balmain Tigers.

Playing career
Scahill was graded by the Balmain Tigers in 1993. With the retirement of long serving  Benny Elias at the end of the 1994 season, Scahill shifted into the hooking role where he would play the remainder of his career.

Scahill played his final game of first grade in his side's 44−6 loss to the Sydney City Roosters in round 22 of the 1995 season. Scahill was released by the Tigers at the end of the season and never played first grade rugby league again. In total, Scahill played 16 games and scored 1 try.

References

1973 births
Living people
Australian rugby league players
Rugby league five-eighths
Rugby league hookers
Rugby league players from Sydney
Balmain Tigers players